Phtheochroa aureoalbida is a species of moth of the family Tortricidae. It is found in North America, where it has been recorded from Alberta, British Columbia, Montana, Colorado and Saskatchewan.

The wingspan is 14–17 mm. Adults have been recorded on wing from June to July.

References

Moths described in 1895
Phtheochroa